Susquehanna may refer to:

Places in the United States
 Susquehanna River, the source of the Chesapeake Bay

In Maryland
 Susquehanna State Park (Maryland)

In Pennsylvania
 Susquehannock tribe, Native American tribe of Pennsylvania
 Susquehanna Bank
 Susquehanna County, Pennsylvania
 Susquehanna Depot, Pennsylvania, a borough in Susquehanna County
 Susquehanna International Group, an institutional sales, research and market making firm
 Susquehanna Area Regional Airport Authority
 Susquehanna State Park (Pennsylvania)
 Susquehanna Steam Electric Station, a nuclear power plant
 Susquehanna Township, Pennsylvania (disambiguation), several places
 Susquehanna Trails, Pennsylvania, a census-designated place in York County
 Susquehanna University, in Selinsgrove, Pennsylvania
 Sesquehanna Sub Division, in Independence, Missouri

Music, arts and entertainment 
 "Susquehanna", an unreleased song by Live recorded during the Throwing Copper sessions
 "Oh, Susquehanna", a song by the band Defiance, Ohio on their 2006 album The Great Depression
 Susquehanna (album), an album by the Cherry Poppin' Daddies
 Susquehanna Radio Corporation, a media corporation from 1941, absorbed into Cumulus Media in 2005
 Drej Queen Susquehana, the main antagonist of the 2000 animated film Titan A.E.

Companies and organizations
 Susquehannah Company, a historical Connecticut company involved in a dispute with Pennsylvania
 Susquehanna International Group, Pennsylvania-based financial services company
 Susquehanna Polling & Research, Pennsylvania-based polling company

Other
Susquehanna, ferry of 453 tons, built in 1837 by Williamson & Richardson
USS Susquehanna, multiple ships
 New York, Susquehanna and Western Railway, often called Susquehanna for short

See also
 
 Susie Q (Susquehanna is also an anagram of the name Susannah Que)